Harry or Henry Bernard may refer to:

Henry Boyle Bernard (1812–1895), Irish Conservative Party politician, MP for Bandon 1863–68
Henry Meyners Bernard (1853–1909), English biologist, mathematician and cleric
Harry Bernard (1878–1940), American film comedy actor with Mack Sennett and Hal Roach
Henry Bernard (architect) (1912–1994), French urban planner, designed Palace of Europe